Bishop Edward J. Galvin (November 23, 1882 - February 23, 1956) was founder of the Missionary Society of St. Columban and first Bishop of Hanyang, China.

Early life
Edward J. Galvin was born at Newcestown, County Cork, Ireland on 23 November 1882. He was ordained a Catholic priest at St Patrick's College, Maynooth, County Kildare, in 1909 for his home diocese of Cork. He spent his first three years as a priest 'on loan' to the diocese of Brooklyn, New York. While there, in January 1912, he met Father Fraser who was en route back to China.

China 1912 – 1916
In February 1912, Fr. 'Ned' Galvin left Brooklyn for China. He went first to Toronto to join Fr. Fraser and together they traveled from Vancouver to Shanghai on the Empress of India. He lived and worked with the French Vincentians in Chekiang (1912–16). In 1916 he returned to Ireland to found a society of missionary priests dedicated to the conversion of China, the Missionary Society of St. Columban.

On 4 September 1916 he met a young professor from the Maynooth seminary, Fr. John Blowick, at Fr. Tom Ronayne's lodgings in Monkstown, County Dublin. On 10 October 1916 they received permission from the Irish hierarchy to establish a "mission house for the training of Irish missionaries for China." After a brief period promoting the Society in Ireland, Edward Galvin left for the U.S. in 1917 to establish the Society there.

China 1920 – 1953
He returned to Ireland to lead the first band of his missionaries to China (1920). From his arrival in China until his expulsion in 1952, Galvin would have experienced some good years, but difficulties and dangers predominated: a corrupt Chinese government, local warlords and banditry, floods, drought, the Japanese invasion. He survived the rigors of World War II, but the end of the war did not mean an end to conflicts. In 1947 he wrote "the peop has gone from me; the war was bad, but post-war problems are the devil entirely."

Expelled from China he returned to his native Ireland in 1953 and retired to Dalgan Park, Navan, County Meath, broken in spirit. He died of leukemia at St. Columbans College, Dalgan Park on 23 February 1956 and is buried there.

See also

References
The Red Lacquered Gate: The Early Days of the Columban Fathers by William E Barrett (Paperback - Jan 1, 1967)
The Missionary Society of St. Columban

Footnotes

1882 births
1956 deaths
Missionary Society of St. Columban
Roman Catholic missionaries in China
Irish expatriate Catholic bishops
Alumni of St Patrick's College, Maynooth
20th-century Roman Catholic bishops in China